Max Obal (born Max David Gotthelf Sroke; 4 September 1881 – 18 May 1949) was a German actor, singer, screenwriter, and film director. He co-directed the 1927 swashbuckler Rinaldo Rinaldini featuring Hans Albers.

Selected filmography
 The Traitress (1911)
 Camera Obscura (1921)
 The Homecoming of Odysseus (1922)
 The Ravine of Death  (1923)
 The Shot in the Pavilion (1925)
 The Woman from the Folies Bergères (1927)
 Rinaldo Rinaldini (co-director: Rudolf Dworsky, 1927)
 A Modern Casanova (1928)
 The Insurmountable (1928)
 The Criminal of the Century (1928)
 Tempo! Tempo! (1929)
  Queen of Fashion (1929)
 Peace of Mind (1931)
 Two Good Comrades (1933)
 Annette in Paradise (1934)
  The Monastery's Hunter (1935)

References

Bibliography
 Grange, William. Cultural Chronicle of the Weimar Republic. Scarecrow Press, 2008.

External links

1881 births
1949 deaths
German film directors
German male film actors
German male stage actors
German musical theatre actors
20th-century German male singers
German male silent film actors
People from Brzeg
20th-century German male actors